Roman Tarasov (born 19 December 1992) is a Russian Paralympic athlete. He won the bronze medal in the men's 100 metres T12 event at the 2020 Summer Paralympics held in Tokyo, Japan. He competed at the Summer Paralympics under the flag of the Russian Paralympic Committee.

References

Living people
1992 births
Russian male sprinters
Athletes (track and field) at the 2020 Summer Paralympics
Medalists at the 2020 Summer Paralympics
Paralympic medalists in athletics (track and field)
Paralympic bronze medalists for the Russian Paralympic Committee athletes
Paralympic athletes of Russia
21st-century Russian people